Georges Célestin Touquet-Daunis (12 March 1879 in Paris – 16 April 1917 in Berry-au-Bac) was a French track and field athlete who competed at the 1900 Summer Olympics in Paris, France. Touquet-Daunis competed in the marathon.  He was one of six runners who did not finish the race.

He was the first official holder of the 5k world record, running a 16:34.6 on 1897-10-31 in Paris, France. He later lowered the record to 16:29.2 on 1899-05-22.

References

External links

 De Wael, Herman. Herman's Full Olympians: "Athletics 1900". Accessed 18 March 2006.
 
 

Athletes (track and field) at the 1900 Summer Olympics
Olympic athletes of France
French male long-distance runners
French male marathon runners
1879 births
1917 deaths
Athletes from Paris